John Joseph Joubert IV (July 2, 1963 – July 17, 1996) was an American serial killer executed in Nebraska. He was convicted of murdering three boys in Maine and Nebraska.

Childhood
Joubert's parents divorced when he was six years old, he lived with his mother in Lawrence, Massachusetts. He was not allowed to visit his father and grew to hate his controlling mother. In 1974, she moved the family to Portland, Maine.

In 1971, Joubert's mother moved them out of their former house into a rundown apartment. At this time, he was considered an outcast at school, and sought to compensate for these feelings of isolation by joining the Cub Scouts. It was around this time that his sadistic and homicidal fantasies progressed to the point where he contemplated murdering strangers on the streets, tying and gagging those who resisted him. In one later psychiatric report, he was described as saying that he derived pleasure from the thought of his victims saying "if you are going to do it, get it over with."

When he was 13, he stabbed a young girl with a pencil and felt sexually stimulated when she cried in pain. The next day, he took a razor blade and slashed another girl as he biked past her. He was never caught for either attack. In another incident, he beat and nearly strangled another boy. He relished the power of bullying, and began to stab or slash others.

Joubert attended Cheverus High School in Portland, graduating in 1981.

Murders
On August 22, 1982, 11-year-old Richard "Ricky" Stetson left home to go jogging on the 3.5 mile long Back Cove Trail in Portland, Maine. When he did not return by dark, his parents called the police. The next day, a motorist discovered the boy's body on the side of Interstate 295. The attacker had attempted to undress him, then stabbed, strangled and bit him. A suspect was arrested for the murder but his teeth did not match the bite mark on Stetson's body, so he was released after a year and a half in custody. No additional leads presented themselves in the case until January 1984.

Danny Joe Eberle, 13 years old, disappeared while delivering the Omaha World-Herald newspaper on Sunday, September 18, 1983, in Bellevue, Nebraska. His brother, who also delivered papers, had not seen him, but he did remember being followed by a white man in a tan car on previous days. It was ascertained that Eberle had delivered only three of the 70 newspapers on his route. At the address of his fourth delivery, his bicycle was discovered along with the rest of the newspapers. There appeared to be no sign of a struggle. Joubert would later describe how he had approached Eberle, drawn a knife, and covered the boy's mouth with his hand. He instructed Eberle to follow him to his car and drove him to a gravel road outside the town.

He had been stripped to his underwear, his feet and hands had been bound, and his mouth had been sealed with surgical tape. Knife wounds across his body suggested he had been tortured before death. In addition, Joubert had stabbed him nine times. As a kidnapping, the crime came under the jurisdiction of the federal government of the United States, so the FBI was called in.

The investigation followed several leads, including a young man who was arrested for molesting two young boys approximately a week after the crime. He failed a polygraph test and had a false alibi, but did not fit the profile the FBI had created for the murderer. He was released due to a lack of evidence. Other known pedophiles in the area were questioned, but the case became cold due to a lack of evidence.

Witnesses again said they saw a white man in a tan car. Joubert said that he had driven up to Walden as he walked, showed him the sheath of his knife and ordered him into the car.

After driving to some railway lines out of town, he ordered Walden to strip to his underwear, which he did, but then Walden refused to lie down. After a brief struggle, Joubert overpowered and then stabbed him. Joubert cut Walden's throat so deeply that he had almost been decapitated. Walden's body was found two days later,  from the town. Although the crimes were similar, there were differences. Walden had not been bound, had been better concealed, and was thought to have been killed immediately after being abducted.

Arrest
On January 11, 1984, a preschool teacher in the area of the murders called police to say that she had seen a young man driving in the area. There are conflicting stories as to what had occurred — whether the car was loitering or just driving around. When the driver saw the teacher writing down his license plate, he stopped and threatened her before fleeing. The car was not tan, but was traced and found to be rented by John Joubert, an enlisted radar technician from Offutt Air Force Base. It turned out that his own car, a tan Chevrolet Nova sedan, was being repaired.

A search warrant was issued, and rope consistent with that used to bind Danny Joe Eberle was found in his barracks room. The FBI found that the unusual rope had been made for the United States military in South Korea. Under interrogation, Joubert admitted obtaining it from the scoutmaster in the troop in which he was an assistant.

Robert K. Ressler, the FBI's head profiler at the time, had access to the information about the two boys in Nebraska and worked up a hypothetical description which matched Joubert in every regard. While presenting the case of the two Nebraska boys to a training class at the FBI academy at Quantico, a police officer from Portland, Maine, observed the similarities to a case in his jurisdiction which took place while Joubert had lived there prior to joining the Air Force. Bite mark comparisons proved that Joubert was responsible for the Maine killing in addition to those in Nebraska. Ressler and the Maine investigators came to believe that Joubert joined the military to get away from Maine after the murder of the Stetson boy.

Further investigation in Maine revealed two crimes between the pencil stabbing of the nine-year-old girl in 1979 and the murder of Stetson in 1982. In 1980, Ressler's investigation revealed that Joubert had slashed a nine-year-old boy and a female teacher in her mid-twenties who both "had been cut rather badly, and were lucky to be alive."

Trials and appeals
Joubert then confessed to killing the two boys and, on January 12, was charged with their murders. After initially pleading not guilty, he changed his plea to guilty. There were several psychiatric evaluations performed on Joubert. One characterized him as having obsessive-compulsive disorder, sadistic tendencies, and schizoid personality disorder.

He was found to have not been psychotic at the time of the crimes. A panel of three judges sentenced him to death for both counts. Joubert was also sentenced to life imprisonment in Maine (which did not have the death penalty) in 1990 for the murder of Ricky Stetson after Joubert's teeth were found to match the bite mark.

In 1995, Joubert filed a writ of habeas corpus to the United States federal courts over the death sentences. His lawyers argued that the aggravating factor of "exceptional depravity" was unconstitutionally vague. The court agreed and the state of Nebraska appealed to the United States District Court for the District of Nebraska. They overturned the appeal, saying that he had shown sadistic behavior by torturing Eberle and Walden.

Joubert was executed on July 17, 1996, by the state of Nebraska in the electric chair. He was the second person executed in Nebraska since the death penalty was reintroduced in the state in 1973. Before his execution, Joubert made a final statement in which he apologized for the murders, saying "I just want to say that again I am sorry for what I have done. I do not know if my death will change anything or if it will bring anyone peace. And I just ask the families of Danny Eberle and Christopher Walden and Richard Stetson to please try to find some peace and ask the people of Nebraska to forgive me. That's all." His last meal consisted of pizza with green peppers and onions, strawberry cheesecake and black coffee.

An appeal to the Nebraska Supreme Court over whether the electric chair in Nebraska is a cruel and unusual punishment revealed that during his execution, Joubert suffered a four-inch brain blister on the top of his head and blistering on both sides of his head above his ears.

Media
Joubert's case was covered on Forensic Files in the season 4 episode "Ties That Bind".

See also 
 Capital punishment in Nebraska
 Capital punishment in the United States
 List of people executed in Nebraska
 List of serial killers in the United States

References
Footnotes

General references
Crime Library
Nebraska Supreme Court to Hear Electric Chair Challenge from Death Penalty Information Center
Inmate Details: 35946 -- John Joubert. Nebraska Department of Correctional Services. Retrieved on 2007-08-17.

1963 births
1996 deaths
20th-century executions by Nebraska
American murderers of children
Cheverus High School alumni
Crime in Omaha, Nebraska
Executed American serial killers
Incidents of violence against boys
People convicted of murder by Maine
People convicted of murder by Nebraska
Prisoners sentenced to life imprisonment by Maine
People executed by Nebraska by electric chair
People from Lawrence, Massachusetts
People from Portland, Maine
People with obsessive–compulsive disorder
People with schizoid personality disorder
Violence against men in North America